Launchbury is a surname. Notable people with the surname include:

Joe Launchbury (born 1991), English rugby union player
John Launchbury, American-British computer scientist 

English-language surnames